Kevin Lobdell Burnham (December 21, 1956 – November 27, 2020) was an American two-time Olympic medalist in the sport of sailing. He won the silver medal in 1992 with Morgan Reeser in the 470 class.

Having competed in Olympic Trials in 1992, 1996, and 2004, Burnham never gave up on his dream of winning a gold medal. In the 2004 Olympics his dream came true and he won the gold medal with Paul Foerster in the 470 class. Kevin was the oldest gold medalist at the 2004 Olympic Games in Athens, Greece. Burnham was an 11-time U.S. champion in various boats. He was a sailing coach for various international teams and he was the Head International 420 Coach for LIMA, The Long Island Mid Atlantic Sailing Team, from September 2015 until March 2017.

Burnham died on November 27, 2020 from complications of pulmonary disease. He was 63 years old.

References

External links
 
 
 
 

1956 births
2020 deaths
American male sailors (sport)
Olympic gold medalists for the United States in sailing
Olympic silver medalists for the United States in sailing
Sailors at the 1992 Summer Olympics – 470
Sailors at the 1996 Summer Olympics – 470
Sailors at the 2004 Summer Olympics – 470
Medalists at the 1992 Summer Olympics
Medalists at the 2004 Summer Olympics
US Sailor of the Year
Deaths from lung disease
People from Hollis, Queens
Sportspeople from Queens, New York